Las Aventuras de Jack is a 1949 Argentine film directed and written by Carlos F. Borcosque based on a novel by Alphonse Daudet. The music was composed by Alejandro Gutiérrez del Barrio. Set in the 19th century, its protagonist is a young man, son of a frivolous countess, who faces the rigors of a tragic life.

Cast
 Juan Carlos Barbieri
 Guillermo Battaglia
 Alberto Bello
 Homero Cárpena
 Eva Caselli
 Manolo Díaz
 Francisco Pablo Donadio
 César Fiaschi
 Nedda Francy
 Antonia Herrero

External links
 

1949 films
1940s Spanish-language films
Argentine black-and-white films
Films based on works by Alphonse Daudet
Films directed by Carlos F. Borcosque
1940s Argentine films